Princess Yeonheung may refer to these Goryeo consorts:

Queen Wonjeong (died 1018), first wife of Hyeonjong
Queen Munhwa (died 1029?), second wife of Seongjong 
Queen Yongsin (died 1036), first wife of Jeongjong
Royal Consort Yongjeol Deok-Bi (died 1102), fourth wife of Jeongjong